Wakako (わかこ, ワカコ) is a feminine Japanese given name.

Possible writings
わかこ (in hiragana)
ワカコ (in katakana)
和佳子 "Japanese/peace, excellent, child"
和歌子 "traditional Japanese poetry, child"
若子 "young child"
和加子 "child who adds peace"

People with the given name
Wakako Yamauchi, a Nisei Asian American female writer
Wakako Hironaka (和歌子), a Japanese writer and politician
Wakako Tsuchida (和歌子), a paraplegic athlete
Wakako Tabata, a Japanese sailor
Wakako Matsumoto, a Japanese voice actress who is better known by the stage name Kujira
Wakako Taniguchi (:ja:谷口和花子), a Japanese voice actress
Wakako Shimazaki (:ja:島崎和歌子), a Japanese musician
Wakako Sakai, a Japanese actor
Wakako Oyagi, a Japanese runner
Wakako Shimazaki, a Japanese actress

Japanese feminine given names